Torricella may refer to:

 Torricella, Apulia, town and comune in the province of Taranto, in the Apulia region of southeast Italy.
 Torricella-Taverne, municipality in the district of Lugano in the canton of Ticino in Switzerland
 Torricella Sicura, town and comune in the province of Teramo, in the Abruzzo region of central Italy.
 Torricella Verzate, comune  in the Province of Pavia in the Italian region Lombardy, Italy.
 Torricella Peligna, comune and town in the Province of Chieti in the Abruzzo region of Italy.
 Torricella del Pizzo, comune (municipality) in the Province of Cremona in the Italian region Lombardy, Italy.
 Torricella in Sabina, comune (municipality) in the Province of Rieti in the Italian region Latium, Italy.